Hessa or Heissa is an island in Ålesund Municipality in Møre og Romsdal county, Norway. It is the westernmost island in the municipality and it is one of the main islands in the island-city of Ålesund. The island is located west and south of the island of Aspøya, south of Giske and Valderøya, east of Godøya, and north of the island of Sula.

The island contains mostly residential neighborhoods concentrated around the urban areas of Sævollen, Slinningen, and Skarbøvik. The island has an elementary school and a lower secondary school.  Skarbøvik Church is the main church for the island's residents.  The Atlantic Sea-Park is situated on Hessa.

See also
List of islands of Norway

References

External links
Hessa elementary school

Ålesund
Islands of Møre og Romsdal